Show Girl is a 1928 American comedy-drama film starring Alice White and Donald Reed. It was based on the first of J. P. McEvoy's two Dixie Dugan novels, as was the 1929 musical. It was followed by a sequel, Show Girl in Hollywood (1930). While the film has no audible dialogue, it is accompanied by a Vitaphone sound-on-disc soundtrack with a musical score and sound effects.

Plot
Dixie Dugan, a Brooklyn cutie, goes to the offices of theatrical producers Eppus and Kibbitzer and exposes her perfections in a bathing suit. Eppus and Kibbitzer express interest in her future and arrange for her to work in a nightclub act with Álvarez Romano. One evening Dixie accompanies wealthy sugardaddy Jack Milton to his apartment, and Álvarez stalks in and wounds Milton with a knife. Jimmy Doyle, a cynical tabloid reporter in love with Dixie, gets the story for his newspaper's front page. Dixie is then kidnaped by Álvarez, but quickly manages to free herself. Jimmy persuades her to hide low as a publicity stunt and puts the "kidnaping" on page one. Dixie is found by Milton, who, by way of apology for ruining her stunt, finances her in a Broadway show written by Jimmy. The show is a success, and Jimmy and Dixie are married.

Cast
Alice White as Dixie Dugan
Donald Reed as Alvarez Romano
Lee Moran as Denny
Charles Delaney as Jimmy
Richard Tucker as Milton
Gwen Lee as Nita Dugan
James Finlayson as Mr. Dugan
Kate Price as Mrs. Dugan
Hugh Roman as Eppus
Bernard Randall as Kibbitzer

Preservation
The film was considered a lost film, with only the Vitaphone soundtrack still in existence. However, a print was discovered in an Italian film archive in 2015. A restored version, with the original Vitaphone soundtrack synched to the print, screened at New York's Film Forum on October 25, 2016, marking the first time the film was publicly exhibited in 88 years. The screening was introduced by Vitaphone Project founder Ron Hutchinson. The film will be planned released by Warner Home Video.

See also

 List of early Warner Bros. talking features

References

External links
 

First National Pictures films
1928 comedy-drama films
American black-and-white films
1920s rediscovered films
1920s English-language films
American silent feature films
1928 films
Publicity stunts in fiction
Rediscovered American films
Films directed by Alfred Santell
1920s American films
Silent American comedy-drama films